Nebria reichii is a species of ground beetle in the Carabinae subfamily that is endemic to Romania.

References

External links
Nebria reichii at Carabidae of the World

reichii
Beetles described in 1826
Beetles of Europe
Endemic fauna of Romania